The Royal Museum (Malay: Muzium Diraja) along Jalan Istana was the former National Palace (Malay: Istana Negara) and former residence of the Yang di-Pertuan Agong (Supreme King) of Malaysia. It stands on a 13-acre (50,000 m2) site, located on a commanding position on the slope of a hill of Bukit Petaling overlooking the Klang River, along Jalan Syed Putra.

It was replaced by the new national palace as the official residence of the king in 2011. In 2013, it was converted into The Royal Museum and referred as Old Istana Negara.

History
The palace was originally a double-storey mansion called The Big House built in 1928 by a local Chinese millionaire, Chan Wing. During the Japanese occupation from 1942 to 1945, it was used as the residence of the Japanese Governor. After the surrender of the Japanese on 15 August 1945, the British Military Administration (BMA) commandeered it for a senior military officers mess from the rank of brigadier. With the formation of the Federation of Malaya in 1950, the Selangor State Government rented the residence from the owners for Straits Dollars 5,000 a month until Merdeka or Independence in 1957. It was renovated to become the palace of His Majesty the Sultan of Selangor. In 1957, the owners sold the property of 13 acres to the Federal Government at an agreed valuation of Straits Dollars 1.4 Million. The Federal Government then converted the residence into the Istana Negara for the newly created sovereign post of Yang di-Pertuan Agong (King) of Malaya which was about to achieve independence that August as scheduled. Since then it has undergone several renovations and extensions. But the most extensive upgrading was carried out in 1980, as it was the first time that the installation ceremony of the Yang di-Pertuan Agong was held at the Istana Negara. Prior to this the Installation Ceremonies were held at the Tunku Abdul Rahman Hall in Jalan Ampang, Kuala Lumpur with the first one held in 1957.

After the Istana Negara was moved to the new palace on Jalan Duta in December 2011, it was later used for a royal exhibition called Raja Kita, in conjunction with the installation of Tuanku Abdul Halim Mu'adzam Shah as the 14th Yang di-Pertuan Agong in 2012. The exhibition started on 15 April 2012 and was later extended to 8 December 2012. Over 314,757 visitors, both local and foreign visited the exhibition between 15 April and 7 December.

It was decided that starting in 2013, two guards in Malay traditional attire would be stationed at the main gateway of the old Istana Negara to revive the nostalgia and tradition of the Malay Sultanate. Information, Communications and Culture Minister Rais Yatim said the practice will help retain the old palace as a must-visit tourist destination. Several rooms and halls at the old Istana Negara will be open to visitors to learn of their use to the previous thirteen Kings who lived in this old royal palace. An inventory will be drawn up of the collections in the palace in the effort to conserve them. Rais Yatim requested the Royal Malaysia Police and the Department of Museums to collaborate in managing the collections.

Palace areas and use

Compound
The building is nestled within an 11.34-hectare compound with a variety of plants and flowers, swimming pool and indoor badminton hall. As the palace grounds are not opened to members of the public or tourists, the Main Palace Entrance is a favourite picture spot for tourists.

The whole area is fenced up and the Royal Insignia of His Majesty is placed on each steel bar between two pillars of the fence. At the front of the Istana Negara, there is the main entrance which resembles an arch. On each side of the arch, are two guard posts to shelter two members of the cavalry in their full dress uniform similar to the ones at Buckingham Palace, London. From 2013 onwards, the full dress uniform will be in Malay traditional attire as it was during the Malay Sultanate era.

In the grounds of the palace is a guard house for the members of the Royal Malay Regiment, one of the two Household Division units in the Malaysian Armed Forces (the other one is the Malaysian Royal Armoured Corps Mounted Ceremonial Squadron). There is also a six-hole golf course, tennis courts and a lake in the far end of the grounds.

The driveway, lined with cypresses and casuarinas, leads to two entrances – an entrance to the West Wing and the other to the East Wing.

East Wing
The Balai Rong Seri or throne room is located in the East Wing and was used only for official and customary functions. These include ceremonial occasions of taking the royal pledge, the installation rite, and the appointment of a new prime minister and the federal government which included investiture ceremonies and the taking of oaths by the government ministers and state governors. This is also where the presentation and acceptance of foreign diplomatic appointments are held. It sometimes serves as a banquet hall.

The second hall on the first floor is the Dewan Mengadap where the King receives honoured guests such as Head of States and foreign dignitaries. This hall doubles as a resting place of Sultans and Governors during the Conference of Rulers. The other rooms are Bilik Duta, Bilik Permaisuri and Bilik Menteri. Bilik Duta is where the King grants audience to the Prime Minister and also where honoured guests are received. The Queen receives her guests at the Bilik Permaisuri while the Bilik Menteri is the rest room for guests.

West Wing
Meetings of the Conference of Rulers were held at the Bilik Mesyuarat Raja-Raja situated in the West Wing.

Gallery

New Istana Negara

The new Istana Negara complex is located on Jalan Tuanku Abdul Halim in Kuala Lumpur. The court moved to the new palace in December 2011.

Construction commenced in mid-2007 and completed in 2011 at a total cost of RM997 million. Works Minister Shaziman Abu Mansor said the palace is now "Kuala Lumpur's most amazing architectural achievement, surpassing even the Twin Towers".

See also
Royal Regalia of Malaysia

References
Notes

Bibliography

External links

Museums in Kuala Lumpur
Military history of Malaya during World War II